Greensburg is an unincorporated community in Knox County, in the U.S. state of Missouri.

History
Greensburg was platted in 1852, and named after James S. Green, a state legislator. A post office called Greensburg was established in 1857, and remained in operation until 1954.

References

Unincorporated communities in Knox County, Missouri
1852 establishments in Missouri
Unincorporated communities in Missouri